The Hailey Methodist Episcopal Church, also known as Hailey Community Baptist Church, in Hailey, Idaho, was listed on the National Register of Historic Places in 2017.

It has an entrance through its -plan belfry tower inset into the building's gable front. Front extension of the roof is supported by purlins. An open-sided bell tower, holding a metal bell and four all-weather speakers, tops the tower.

It was built in 1886 and survived numerous fires in Hailey, probably due to relatively wide separation from its neighbors.

See also
Emmanuel Episcopal Church (Hailey, Idaho) (1885)

References

Churches on the National Register of Historic Places in Idaho
Gothic Revival architecture in Idaho
Episcopal church buildings in Idaho
Blaine County, Idaho